Jozef Valachovič (born 12 July 1975) is former Slovak international footballer and later football manager. He played 33 matches for the Slovak national football team.

On 15 March 2021 Valachovič became manager of Czech First League club 1. FK Příbram.

References

1975 births
Living people
Slovak footballers
FK Inter Bratislava players
AS Trenčín players
Maccabi Tel Aviv F.C. players
FC Slovan Liberec players
SK Rapid Wien players
ŠK Slovan Bratislava players
Slovak Super Liga players
Israeli Premier League players
Austrian Football Bundesliga players
Slovak expatriate footballers
Slovakia international footballers
Expatriate footballers in Israel
Expatriate footballers in the Czech Republic
Expatriate footballers in Austria
Slovak expatriate sportspeople in Israel
Slovak expatriate sportspeople in the Czech Republic
Slovak expatriate sportspeople in Austria
Association football defenders
1. FK Příbram managers
Czech First League managers
Expatriate football managers in the Czech Republic
Footballers from Bratislava
Slovak football managers